Heidelberg is a town in the Western Cape, South Africa. It is located near South Africa's south coast, on the N2 highway, 274 km east of Cape Town (about halfway between Cape Town and Knysna). Heidelberg is just east of the Overberg region, and some consider it the beginning of the Garden Route. Heidelberg is part of the Hessequa Local Municipality. Fourie House on Fourie Street is the oldest house in Heidelberg.

History

In 1716, Louis Fourie obtained grazing rights from Governor van der Stel and he settled alongside the Duivenhoks River. This is where he later constructed the Doornboom Homestead - registered in 1728 - and the Doornboom Farm was established.

The area was initially part of the greater Riversdale district until the Riversdale Dutch Reformed church council in 1855 bought a portion of the farm Doornboom on which to lay out the town when a new Dutch Reformed congregation was created for the farmers between Swellendam and Riversdale.

The town grew around the church and it was named in honour of the German town, Heidelberg, because of the Heidelberg catechism that was practiced in the church.

In 1903 Heidelberg became part of the railway network and became an important transport link for the wool, wheat, fruit, and tobacco industries of the area. The river, the Duivenhoks (Dovecote), was named by an explorer, Isaq Schrijver, who observed a lot of doves where the river flows into the Indian Ocean, at a place called Puntjie.

References

External links

Heidelberg Info and Tourism Website
Hessequa Tourism Pages
Heidelberg Weather

Populated places in the Hessequa Local Municipality